The 1980 United States Senate election in Maryland took place on November 4, 1980.

Incumbent Republican U.S Senator Charles Mathias won re-election to a third term in a landslide, defeating Democratic State Senator Edward T. Conroy.

It is also the last time a Republican won Prince George's County and the city of Baltimore in a statewide election.

Republican primary

Candidates
 Roscoe Bartlett
 John M. Brennan
 Jack Fortune Holden
 Charles Mathias, incumbent Senator
 V. Dallas Merrell
 Gerald G. Warren

Results

Democratic primary

Candidates
 Frank J. Broschart, candidate for U.S. Representative in 1972
 Edward T. Conroy, State Senator from Bowie
 Mello Cottone
 Victor Crawford, State Senator from Silver Spring
 Robert L. Douglass, State Senator from Baltimore
 John A. Kennedy
 Dennis C. McCoy, Delegate from Baltimore
 R. Spencer Oliver, Chief of Staff of the Commission on Security and Cooperation in Europe
 David E. Shaw
 Kurt Summers
 Richard J. Taranto
 James A. Young

Results

General election

Results

See also 
 1980 United States Senate elections

References 

Maryland
1980
1980 Maryland elections